A Pythagorean triple consists of three positive integers , , and , such that . For example,  is a primitive Pythagorean triple whereas  is not. A triangle whose sides form a Pythagorean triple is called a Pythagorean triangle, and is necessarily a right triangle.

The name is derived from the Pythagorean theorem, stating that every right triangle has side lengths satisfying the formula ; thus, Pythagorean triples describe the three integer side lengths of a right triangle. However, right triangles with non-integer sides do not form Pythagorean triples. Moreover,  and  do not have an integer common multiple because  is irrational.

Pythagorean triples have been known since ancient times. The oldest known record comes from Plimpton 322, a Babylonian clay tablet from about 1800 BC, written in a sexagesimal number system. It was discovered by Edgar James Banks shortly after 1900, and sold to George Arthur Plimpton in 1922, for $10.

When searching for integer solutions, the equation  is a Diophantine equation. Thus Pythagorean triples are among the oldest known solutions of a nonlinear Diophantine equation.

Examples

There are 16 primitive Pythagorean triples of numbers up to 100:

Other small Pythagorean triples such as (6, 8, 10) are not listed because they are not primitive; for instance (6, 8, 10) is a multiple of (3, 4, 5).

Each of these points (with their multiples) forms a radiating line in the scatter plot to the right. 

Additionally, these are the remaining primitive Pythagorean triples of numbers up to 300:

Generating a triple

The formula states that the integers

form a Pythagorean triple.

It follows that there are infinitely many primitive Pythagorean triples.

This can be remedied by inserting an additional parameter  to the formula. The following will generate all Pythagorean triples uniquely:

That these formulas generate Pythagorean triples can be verified by expanding  using elementary algebra and verifying that the result equals .

Many formulas for generating triples with particular properties have been developed since the time of Euclid.

Proof of Euclid's formula

A proof of the necessity that a, b, c be expressed by Euclid's formula for any primitive Pythagorean triple is as follows.

From  we obtain  and hence . Then . Then solving

If they were both odd, the numerator of  would be a multiple of 4 (because an odd square is congruent to 1 modulo 4), and the denominator 2mn would not be a multiple of 4. Since 4 would be the minimum possible even factor in the numerator and 2 would be the maximum possible even factor in the denominator, this would imply  to be even despite defining it as odd. One may thus equate numerators with numerators and denominators with denominators, giving Euclid's formula 

A longer but more commonplace proof is given in Maor (2007) and Sierpiński (2003).

Interpretation of parameters in Euclid's formula

A variant

Elementary properties of primitive Pythagorean triples

General properties

  is always a perfect square. As it is only a necessary condition but not a sufficient one, it can be used in checking if a given triple of numbers is not a Pythagorean triple when they fail the test.  For example, the triples  and  each pass the test that  is a perfect square, but neither is a Pythagorean triple.
The area of a Pythagorean triangle cannot be the square or twice the square of a natural number.
The largest number that always divides abc is 60.
See almost-isosceles PPT section below. However, only even numbers divisible by 4 can be the even leg of a PPT.
The hypotenuse  is the sum of two squares. This requires all of its prime factors to be primes of the form . Therefore, c is of the form .
The area  is a congruent number divisible by 6.
In every Pythagorean triangle, the radius of the incircle and the radii of the three excircles are natural numbers.
When the area of a Pythagorean triangle is multiplied by the curvatures of its incircle and 3 excircles, the result is four positive integers , respectively. Integers  satisfy Descartes's Circle Equation. Equivalently, the radius of the outer Soddy circle of any right triangle is equal to its semiperimeter.
Only two sides of a primitive Pythagorean triple can be simultaneously prime because by Euclid's formula for generating a primitive Pythagorean triple, one of the legs must be composite and even.
There are no Pythagorean triangles in which the hypotenuse and one leg are the legs of another Pythagorean triangle; this is one of the equivalent forms of Fermat's right triangle theorem.
Each primitive Pythagorean triangle has a ratio of area, to squared semiperimeter, that is unique to itself and is given by
 
No primitive Pythagorean triangle has an integer altitude from the hypotenuse; that is, every primitive Pythagorean triangle is indecomposable.
The set of all primitive Pythagorean triples forms a rooted ternary tree in a natural way; see Tree of primitive Pythagorean triples.
Neither of the acute angles of a Pythagorean triangle can be a rational number of degrees.  (This follows from Niven's theorem.)

Special cases

In addition, special Pythagorean triples with certain additional properties can be guaranteed to exist:
Every integer greater than 2 that is not congruent to 2 mod 4 (in other words, every integer greater than 2 which is not of the form ) is part of a primitive Pythagorean triple.
Every integer greater than 2 is part of a primitive or non-primitive Pythagorean triple.
There exist infinitely many Pythagorean triples in which the hypotenuse and the longest leg differ by exactly one. Such triples are necessarily primitive and have the form . This results from Euclid's formula by remarking that the condition implies that the triple is primitive and must verify . This implies , and thus .
There exist infinitely many primitive Pythagorean triples in which the hypotenuse and the longest leg differ by exactly two. They are all primitive, and are obtained by putting  in Euclid's formula. They are obtained by putting  in Euclid's formula.
There exist infinitely many Pythagorean triples in which the two legs differ by exactly one.
For each natural number , there exist  Pythagorean triples with different hypotenuses and the same area.
For each natural number , there exist at least  different primitive Pythagorean triples with the same leg , where  is some natural number (the length of the even leg is 2mn, and it suffices to choose  with many factorizations, for example , where  is a product of  different odd primes; this produces at least  different primitive triples).
For each natural number , there exist at least  different Pythagorean triples with the same hypotenuse.
If  is a prime power, there exists a primitive Pythagorean triple  if and only if  the prime  has the form ; this triple is unique up to the exchange of a and b. 
There exist infinitely many Pythagorean triples with square numbers for both the hypotenuse  and the sum of the legs .
There exist non-primitive Pythagorean triangles with integer altitude from the hypotenuse. Such Pythagorean triangles are known as decomposable since they can be split along this altitude into two separate and smaller Pythagorean triangles.

Geometry of Euclid's formula

Rational points on a unit circle

Euclid's formula for a Pythagorean triple

can be understood in terms of the geometry of rational points on the unit circle .

In fact, a point in the Cartesian plane with coordinates  belongs to the unit circle if .

The unit circle may also be defined by a parametric equation

Note that  is also the tangent of half of the angle that is opposite the triangle side of length .

Stereographic approach

There is a correspondence between points on the unit circle with rational coordinates and primitive Pythagorean triples. At this point, Euclid's formulae can be derived either by methods of trigonometry or equivalently by using the stereographic projection.

For the stereographic approach, suppose that ′ is a point on the -axis with rational coordinates

Then, it can be shown by basic algebra that the point  has coordinates

This establishes that each rational point of the -axis goes over to a rational point of the unit circle. The converse, that every rational point of the unit circle comes from such a point of the -axis, follows by applying the inverse stereographic projection. Then the point ′ obtained by stereographic projection onto the -axis has coordinates

which is rational.

In terms of algebraic geometry, the algebraic variety of rational points on the unit circle is birational to the affine line over the rational numbers. The unit circle is thus called a rational curve, and it is this fact which enables an explicit parameterization of the (rational number) points on it by means of rational functions.

Pythagorean triangles in a 2D lattice
A 2D lattice is a regular array of isolated points where if any one point is chosen as the Cartesian origin (0, 0), then all the other points are at  where  and  range over all positive and negative integers. The count of lattice points lying strictly within the bounds of the triangle is given by    for primitive Pythagorean triples this interior lattice count is   The area (by Pick's theorem equal to one less than the interior lattice count plus half the boundary lattice count) equals   .

The first occurrence of two primitive Pythagorean triples sharing the same area occurs with triangles with sides  and common area 210 . As yet, no set of three primitive Pythagorean triples have been found sharing the same interior lattice count.

Enumeration of primitive Pythagorean triples
Hence there is a 1 to 1 mapping of rationals (in lowest terms) to primitive Pythagorean triples where  is in the interval  and  odd.

It is then possible to determine the rational .

In order to enumerate primitive Pythagorean triples the rational can be expressed as an ordered pair  and mapped to an integer using a pairing function such as Cantor's pairing function. It begins
 and gives rationals
 these, in turn, generate primitive triples

Spinors and the modular group
Pythagorean triples can likewise be encoded into a square matrix of the form

A matrix of this form is symmetric.

which is zero precisely when  is a Pythagorean triple. If  corresponds to a Pythagorean triple, then as a matrix it must have rank 1.

Since  is symmetric, it follows from a result in linear algebra that there is a column vector  such that the outer product

holds, where the  denotes the matrix transpose. The vector ξ is called a spinor (for the Lorentz group SO(1, 2)).

The modular group Γ is the set of 2×2 matrices with integer entries

with determinant equal to one: . This set forms a group, since the inverse of a matrix in Γ is again in Γ, as is the product of two matrices in Γ. The modular group acts on the collection of all integer spinors. Furthermore, the group is transitive on the collection of integer spinors with relatively prime entries. For if  has relatively prime entries, then

This does not give a well-defined action on primitive triples, since it may take a primitive triple to an imprimitive one. It follows that the action of the modular group is transitive on the set of standard triples.

Let the subgroup Γ(2) of Γ be the kernel of the group homomorphism

where  is the special linear group over the finite field  of integers modulo 2. Then Γ(2) is the group of unimodular transformations which preserve the parity of each entry. In fact, under the action, the group Γ(2) acts transitively on the collection of primitive Pythagorean triples .

The group Γ(2) is the free group whose generators are the matrices

Consequently, every primitive Pythagorean triple can be obtained in a unique way as a product of copies of the matrices  and .

Parent/child relationships

In other words, every primitive triple will be a "parent" to three additional primitive triples.
(3 − (2×4) + (2×5), (2×3) − 4 + (2×5), (2×3) − (2×4) + (3×5)) = (5, 12, 13), 
and similarly  and  produce the triples (21, 20, 29) and (15, 8, 17).

The linear transformations T1, T2, and T3 have a geometric interpretation in the language of quadratic forms.

Relation to Gaussian integers

Alternatively, Euclid's formulae can be analyzed and proved using the Gaussian integers. The units of Gaussian integers are ±1 and ±i. The ordinary integers are called the rational integers and denoted as ''. The right-hand side of the Pythagorean theorem may be factored in Gaussian integers:

This can be proved using the property that every Gaussian integer can be factored uniquely into Gaussian primes up to units. (This unique factorization follows from the fact that, roughly speaking, a version of the Euclidean algorithm can be defined on them.) The proof has three steps. First, if  and  share no prime factors in the integers, then they also share no prime factors in the Gaussian integers. Then  and  lie on the same line through the origin. All Gaussian integers on such a line are integer multiples of some Gaussian integer . Second, it follows that  and  likewise share no prime factors in the Gaussian integers. From the formula , that in turn would imply that  is even, contrary to the hypothesis of a primitive Pythagorean triple. Third, since  is a square, every Gaussian prime in its factorization is doubled, i.e., appears an even number of times. Since  and  share no prime factors, this doubling is also true for them.

Thus, the first factor can be written

The real and imaginary parts of this equation give the two formulas:

For any primitive Pythagorean triple, there must be integers  and  such that these two equations are satisfied. Hence, every Pythagorean triple can be generated from some choice of these integers.

As perfect square Gaussian integers
If we consider the square of a Gaussian integer we get the following direct interpretation of Euclid's formula as representing the perfect square of a Gaussian integer.

Using the facts that the Gaussian integers are a Euclidean domain and that for a Gaussian integer p  is always a square it is possible to show that a Pythagorean triple corresponds to the square of a prime Gaussian integer if the hypotenuse is prime.

Since magnitudes multiply in the Gaussian integers, the product must be , which when squared to find a Pythagorean triple must be composite. The contrapositive completes the proof.

Distribution of triples

There are a number of results on the distribution of Pythagorean triples. In the scatter plot, a number of obvious patterns are already apparent. Whenever the legs  of a primitive triple appear in the plot, all integer multiples of  must also appear in the plot, and this property produces the appearance of lines radiating from the origin in the diagram.

Within the scatter, there are sets of parabolic patterns with a high density of points and all their foci at the origin, opening up in all four directions. Different parabolas intersect at the axes and appear to reflect off the axis with an incidence angle of 45 degrees, with a third parabola entering in a perpendicular fashion. Within this quadrant, each arc centered on the origin shows that section of the parabola that lies between its tip and its intersection with its semi-latus rectum.

These patterns can be explained as follows. If  is an integer, then is a Pythagorean triple. If  is varied for a given  (i.e. on a given parabola), integer values of  occur relatively frequently if  is a square or a small multiple of a square. If several such values happen to lie close together, the corresponding parabolas approximately coincide, and the triples cluster in a narrow parabolic strip. For instance,

The angular properties described above follow immediately from the functional form of the parabolas. Since the clusters, like all triples, are repeated at integer multiples, the value  also corresponds to a cluster.

Albert Fässler and others provide insights into the significance of these parabolas in the context of conformal mappings.

Special cases and related equations

The Platonic sequence
The case  of the more general construction of Pythagorean triples has been known for a long time. Proclus, in his commentary to the 47th Proposition of the first book of Euclid's Elements, describes it as follows:

Certain methods for the discovery of triangles of this kind are handed down, one which they refer to Plato, and another to Pythagoras. (The latter) starts from odd numbers. For it makes the odd number the smaller of the sides about the right angle; then it takes the square of it, subtracts unity and makes half the difference the greater of the sides about the right angle; lastly it adds unity to this and so forms the remaining side, the hypotenuse.
...For the method of Plato argues from even numbers. It takes the given even number and makes it one of the sides about the right angle; then, bisecting this number and squaring the half, it adds unity to the square to form the hypotenuse, and subtracts unity from the square to form the other side about the right angle. ... Thus it has formed the same triangle that which was obtained by the other method.

In equation form, this becomes:

 is odd (Pythagoras, c. 540 BC):

 is even (Plato, c. 380 BC):

It can be shown that all Pythagorean triples can be obtained, with appropriate rescaling, from the basic Platonic sequence (and ) by allowing  to take non-integer rational values. If  is replaced with the fraction  in the sequence, the result is equal to the 'standard' triple generator (2mn,) after rescaling. It follows that every triple has a corresponding rational  value which can be used to generate a similar triangle (one with the same three angles and with sides in the same proportions as the original). The Platonic sequence itself can be derived by following the steps for 'splitting the square' described in Diophantus II.VIII.

The Jacobi–Madden equation

The equation,

is equivalent to the special Pythagorean triple,

There is an infinite number of solutions to this equation as solving for the variables involves an elliptic curve. Small ones are,

Equal sums of two squares

Equal sums of two fourth powers

Given two sets of Pythagorean triples,

the problem of finding equal products of a non-hypotenuse side and the hypotenuse,

is easily seen to be equivalent to the equation,

Since he showed this is a rational point in an elliptic curve, then there is an infinite number of solutions. In fact, he also found a 7th degree polynomial parameterization.

Descartes' Circle Theorem

For the case of Descartes' circle theorem where all variables are squares,

Euler showed this is equivalent to three simultaneous Pythagorean triples,

There is also an infinite number of solutions, and for the special case when , then the equation simplifies to,

Almost-isosceles Pythagorean triples

There are, however, right-angled triangles with integral sides for which the lengths of the non-hypotenuse sides differ by one, such as,

and an infinite number of others. They can be completely parameterized as,

where {x, y} are the solutions to the Pell equation .

This sequence of PPTs forms the central stem (trunk) of the rooted ternary tree of PPTs.

When it is the longer non-hypotenuse side and hypotenuse that differ by one, such as in

and

where integer  is the generating parameter.

It shows that all odd numbers (greater than 1) appear in this type of almost-isosceles PPT. This sequence of PPTs forms the right hand side outer stem of the rooted ternary tree of PPTs.

Another property of this type of almost-isosceles PPT is that the sides are related such that 

for some integer . Or in other words  is divisible by  such as in
.

Fibonacci numbers in Pythagorean triples

Starting with 5, every second Fibonacci number is the length of the hypotenuse of a right triangle with integer sides, or in other words, the largest number in a Pythagorean triple, obtained from the formula

The sequence of Pythagorean triangles obtained from this formula has sides of lengths
(3,4,5), (5,12,13), (16,30,34), (39,80,89), ...
The middle side of each of these triangles is the sum of the three sides of the preceding triangle.

Generalizations
There are several ways to generalize the concept of Pythagorean triples.

Pythagorean -tuple

The expression

The Pythagorean -tuple can be made primitive by dividing out by the largest common divisor of its values.

Furthermore, any primitive Pythagorean -tuple  can be found by this approach. Dividing out by the largest common divisor of these  values gives the same primitive Pythagorean -tuple; and there is a one-to-one correspondence between tuples of setwise coprime positive integers  satisfying  and primitive Pythagorean -tuples.

Examples of the relationship between setwise coprime values  and primitive Pythagorean -tuples include:

Consecutive squares

one may find values  so that  is a square, such as one by Hirschhorn where the number of terms is itself a square,

For the smallest case , hence , this yields the well-known cannonball-stacking problem of Lucas,

a fact which is connected to the Leech lattice.

In addition, if in a Pythagorean -tuple all addends are consecutive except one, one can use the equation,

Since the second power of  cancels out, this is only linear and easily solved for as  though ,  should be chosen so that  is an integer,  with a small example being ,  yielding,

Thus, one way of generating Pythagorean -tuples is by using, for various ,

where q = n–2 and where

Fermat's Last Theorem

Pierre de Fermat in 1637 claimed that no such triple exists, a claim that came to be known as Fermat's Last Theorem because it took longer than any other conjecture by Fermat to be proved or disproved. The first proof was given by Andrew Wiles in 1994.

or  th powers summing to an th power

Another generalization is searching for sequences of  positive integers for which the th power of the last is the sum of the th powers of the previous terms.

  = 3: {3, 4, 5; 6}.
  = 4: {30, 120, 272, 315; 353}
  = 5: {19, 43, 46, 47, 67; 72}
  = 7: {127, 258, 266, 413, 430, 439, 525; 568}
  = 8: {90, 223, 478, 524, 748, 1088, 1190, 1324; 1409}

For the  case, in which  called the  Fermat cubic, a general formula exists giving all solutions.

A slightly different generalization allows the sum of  th powers to equal the sum of  th powers. For example:
: 1 + 12 = 9 + 10, made famous by Hardy's recollection of a conversation with Ramanujan about the number 1729 being the smallest number that can be expressed as a sum of two cubes in two distinct ways.

The smallest known counterexamples are

 : (95800, 217519, 414560; 422481)
 : (27, 84, 110, 133; 144)

Heronian triangle triples

A Heronian triangle is commonly defined as one with integer sides whose area is also an integer.
Every Pythagorean triple is a Heronian triple, because at least one of the legs ,  must be even in a Pythagorean triple, so the area ab/2 is an integer. Not every Heronian triple is a Pythagorean triple, however, as the example  with area 24 shows.

If  is a Heronian triple, so is  where  is any positive integer; its area will be the integer that is  times the integer area of the  triangle.
The Heronian triple  is primitive provided a, b, c are setwise coprime. Here are a few of the simplest primitive Heronian triples that are not Pythagorean triples:

 (4, 13, 15) with area 24
 (3, 25, 26) with area 36
 (7, 15, 20) with area 42
 (6, 25, 29) with area 60
 (11, 13, 20) with area 66
 (13, 14, 15) with area 84
 (13, 20, 21) with area 126

 
or equivalently
 

be a nonzero perfect square divisible by 16.

Application to cryptography
Primitive Pythagorean triples have been used in cryptography as random sequences and for the generation of keys.

See also

 Boolean Pythagorean triples problem
 Congruum
 Diophantus II.VIII
 Eisenstein triple
 Euler brick
 Heronian triangle
 Hilbert's theorem 90
 Integer triangle
 Modular arithmetic
 Nonhypotenuse number
 Plimpton 322
 Pythagorean prime
 Pythagorean quadruple
 Quadric
 Tangent half-angle formula
 Trigonometric identity

Notes

References

External links 
 Clifford Algebras and Euclid's Parameterization of Pythagorean triples
 Curious Consequences of a Miscopied Quadratic
 Discussion of Properties of Pythagorean triples, Interactive Calculators, Puzzles and Problems
 Generating Pythagorean Triples Using Arithmetic Progressions
 
 Interactive Calculator for Pythagorean Triples
 The negative Pell equation and Pythagorean triples
 Parameterization of Pythagorean Triples by a single triple of polynomials
 
 Pythagorean Triples and the Unit Circle, chap. 2–3, in "A Friendly Introduction to Number Theory" by Joseph H. Silverman, 3rd ed., 2006, Pearson Prentice Hall, Upper Saddle River, NJ, 
 Pythagorean Triples at cut-the-knot Interactive Applet showing unit circle relationships to Pythagorean Triples
 Pythagorean Triplets
 The Remarkable Incircle of a Triangle
 Solutions to Quadratic Compatible Pairs in relation to Pythagorean Triples
 Theoretical properties of the Pythagorean Triples and connections to geometry
 The Trinary Tree(s) underlying Primitive Pythagorean Triples at cut-the-knot
 

Arithmetic problems of plane geometry
Diophantine equations
Triple
Squares in number theory

no:Pythagoras’ læresetning#Pytagoreiske tripler